Timon Seubert (born 23 April 1987, in Hamburg) is a German cyclist. He rode in the 2012 Giro d'Italia.

Palmares
2010
2nd Okolo Slovenska

References

1987 births
Living people
German male cyclists
Cyclists from Hamburg
21st-century German people